Jonathan Coeffic (born 1 June 1981 in Villeurbanne) is a French rower. He competed at the 2008 Summer Olympics, where he won a bronze medal in quadruple skull.

References 
 

1981 births
Living people
French male rowers
Olympic rowers of France
Olympic bronze medalists for France
Olympic medalists in rowing
Medalists at the 2008 Summer Olympics
Rowers at the 2004 Summer Olympics
Rowers at the 2008 Summer Olympics
World Rowing Championships medalists for France
People from Villeurbanne
Sportspeople from Lyon Metropolis
21st-century French people